The eleven season of the German-version of the reality show I'm a Celebrity...Get Me Out of Here! began on 12 January 2017. In the last episode of Season 10 the presenters Zietlow and Hartwich announced that the show would return for an 11th season in January 2017.  The contestants were announced in early January 2017. 12 participants were announced to compete. The group of contestants was split into two camps with six participants living in each of the camps. Bushtucker duels took place instead of the original bushtucker trials. The season started off with a special on 13 January.

Contestants 
Twelve contestants take part in this season. Before the season started, Nastassja Kinski withdrew from the show and was replaced by Kader Loth. Participants moved on 12 January 2017 Australian time to camp. This was the first season to have no voluntary exit by a contestant.

Results and elimination

 Indicates that the celebrity received the most votes from the public
 Indicates that the celebrity received the fewest votes and was eliminated immediately (no bottom two)
 Indicates that the celebrity was in the bottom two of the public vote

The Camps
At the beginning of the season saw the first two camps and thus the teams  Base Camp  and  Snake Rock . In the first episode, Honey for Base Camp and Hanka for Snake Rock selected their team alternately.  While the team phase, the bushtucker trials were carried out as a duel, in which one of each camp fighting for star or food rations. Only the team of the winner got the earned number of rations, the losing team had to make do with rice and beans.

After four days in the Australian jungle, the camps were merged on 16 January. The candidates of the team  Snake Rock 'walked' in the well-known Camp, which was already used by the team  Base Camp  since the beginning of the season.

Bushtucker Trials & Duels

Statistics

Ratings

References 

2017 German television seasons
11